Gary Cooper (born 20 November 1965) is an English former professional footballer born in Hammersmith, London, who played as a midfielder or defender. He made more than 200 appearances in the Football League playing for Queens Park Rangers, Brentford, Maidstone United, Peterborough United and Birmingham City. Cooper played for England at youth level.

Honours
Fisher Athletic
Southern Football League Premier Division champions: 1986–87
Birmingham City
Football League Second Division (level 3) champions: 1994–95
Football League Trophy winners: 1994–95

References

External links

1965 births
Living people
Footballers from Hammersmith
English footballers
England youth international footballers
Association football midfielders
Association football defenders
Queens Park Rangers F.C. players
Brentford F.C. players
Fisher Athletic F.C. players
Maidstone United F.C. (1897) players
Peterborough United F.C. players
Birmingham City F.C. players
Welling United F.C. players
English Football League players
Southern Football League players
National League (English football) players